Diesel Boy is an American punk rock band from Santa Rosa, California, United States. They were formed in 1993 and were active until 2002. In 2022, they announced they would release a new album for SBÄM in 2023. They have a 7" on Fat Wreck Chords, 4 full-length albums released on Honest Don's Records and a split EP with the band Divit that was released on Coldfront Records.

History
The band was formed in summer 1993, and soon after the world was introduced to their clever use of puns with their 7" release on Fat Wreck Chords, aptly titled Strap on Seven Inch, with four tracks, the first of which was "Titty Twister". Shortly afterwards in September 1996, Cock Rock would be released as their debut full length, released on Honest Don's Records, a partner label of Fat Wreck Chords, for which Diesel Boy was the flagship band. Ryan Greene produced all four albums the band would eventually release.

The band toured relentlessly from 1995 to 2002. It is estimated that they played in 40 of the 50 U.S. states, every province in Canada (where it is arguable that the band enjoyed its biggest following), Europe for three times, and Australia. During this time they played with the likes of No Use for a Name, NOFX, Good Riddance, The Vandals, Strung Out, SNFU, Gob, The Goober Patrol, The Ataris, Satanic Surfers, and The Sugar Hill Gang.

Strung Out took them on their first U.S./Canada tour which followed the buzz created by appearance of the band's instant classic "Titty Twister", on the Fat Records compilation Survival of the Fattest. Their second album, Venus Envy (1998), marked the departure of drummer and original member, Mike (Baump) Schaus. Geoff (Lackey) Arcuri, formerly of the Florida band Shyster, joined Diesel Boy in late 1998. A third album followed in 1999 called Sofa King Cool.

Diesel Boy appears, as a band, while performing their own material from the Cock Rock album, on an episode of Freaks and Geeks called "Moshing and Noshing" that aired in 2000.

Following their 2001 album Rode Hard and Put Away Wet, the band unofficially split up. Vocalist Diesel Dave said in a 2011 interview that "things just got wound down".

In 2006, the band created a MySpace page and later in 2009 a Facebook page. In 2011, the band got back together and on July 18, 2011 announced on their Facebook page that they will write a new album. Several songs were composed, but due to the geographic difficulties (Diesel Dave was based in Seattle whereas the other members in California) as well as family reasons were not able to complete the album, and no musical content has been released since.

The band did however play some gigs, such as at the Hits and Pits Tour in Australia in March 2013. In 2015 the band cancelled their appearance at the GROEZROCK festival in Meerhout, Belgium with no explanation.

The band's vocalist, Diesel Dave, remains connected to writing by free-lancing for various publications, weekly magazines (such as the Seattle Weekly) and various blogs including a health industry publications.

In 2016, Diesel Dave launched a new band called Dirty Outs along with an EP containing six songs.

Members
Dave "Diesel Dave" Lake – vocals and guitar (1993–present)
Greg Hensley – bass guitar (1993-present)
Christopher Thomas – drummer (2021-present). He also plays in the band Mansions.
Chad Philipps – guitar (2021-present)
Justin Werth – guitar and vocal harmonies (1993-2021). He has also played guitar in Fang.
Geoff Arcuri – drummer (1999–2021)
Mike Schaus – drummer (1993–1999)

Discography

Studio albums
Cock Rock (1996)
Venus Envy (1998)
Sofa King Cool (1999)
Rode Hard and Put Away Wet (2001)

EPs
Strap on Seven Inch (1996)
Double Letter Score (with Divit) (2001)

Music videos
"She's My Queen" (1999)

Appearances in popular culture
Their song from the Venus Envy album, "Endless Summer Days", appears in the full-length feature Drive Me Crazy.
Three of their songs of the Sofa King Cool album, "A Literary Love Song", "She's My Queen" and "Shining Star", were featured as soundtracks in the 1999 video game, Test Drive Off-Road 3.
The song "She's My Queen" from the Sofa King Cool album was mentioned in the Paul Simon biography A Life, as a song that references Joe DiMaggio (although it is incorrectly referred to as "She's My Marilyn Monroe").
The song "True Drew" is mentioned in the book Rock and Roll Baby Names as a rock song related to the name Drew.

References

External links
Diesel Boy's official MySpace page

Musical groups established in 1993
Punk rock groups from California
Skate punk groups
Pop punk groups from California
1993 establishments in California